Tatiana Borisovna Potemkina (Russian - Татья́на Бори́совна Потёмкина; née Golitsyna / Голицына; 30 January 1797, St Petersburg - 1 July 1869, Berlin) was a Russian noblewoman and philanthropist from the house of Golitsyn. She was a daughter of Ana Gruzinsky and her husband Boris Andreevich Golitsyn. In 1814 she married Alexandr Mikhailovich Potemkin. She funded the restoration of the Holy Mountains Lavra monastery.

Sources
https://web.archive.org/web/20160304134420/http://keliya.org/Biblio/16-19/Ignaty/tom8-11.htm

1797 births
1869 deaths
Tatiana
Tatiana
Philanthropists from the Russian Empire
Russian people of Georgian descent
19th-century philanthropists
Burials at the Annunciation Church of the Alexander Nevsky Lavra
Russian princesses